Secret Boutique is a 2019 South Korean television series starring Kim Sun-a, Chang Mi-hee, Park Hee-von, Go Min-si, Kim Jae-young and Kim Tae-hoon. It aired on SBS TV from September 18 to November 28, 2019.

The series is the last Wednesday-Thursday Drama Special project of SBS.

Synopsis
Secret Boutique is a female-centric drama about money, power, revenge and survival.

It follows the story of Jenny Jang (Kim Sun-a), the owner of J-Boutique that looks like a normal clothing and accessories store from the outside, but is actually a secret network connecting the political and business circles to a small law firm that secretly solves problems of the upper class.

Cast

Main
 Kim Sun-a as Jenny Jang / Jang Do-young, an orphan who goes from working at a bathhouse to becoming an influential lobbyist.
 Jung Da-eun as young Jenny Jang
 Chang Mi-hee as Kim Yeo-ok
 Park Hee-von as Wi Ye-nam
 Go Min-si as Lee Hyeon-ji
 Kim Jae-young as Yoon Seon-woo
 Kim Tae-hoon as Wi Jung-hyuk
 Yoo Jung-woo as Wi Jung-hyuk (20 years old)

Supporting
 Ryu Seung-soo as Cha Seung-jae
 Ryu Won as Wi Ye-eun
 Han Jung-soo as Mr. Hwang
 Joo Suk-tae as Oh Tae Suk, Intelligence Chief of Yoong Chun PD.

Production
 Actress Lee Mi-sook was cast for the series but withdrew due to personal reasons.
 The first script reading was held on March 14, 2019 at SBS Ilsan Production Center.
 The series was planned to be the succeeding drama to My Absolute Boyfriend, but was pushed back from its July premiere to September due to the suspension of the Monday-Tuesday drama timeslot.
 Filming was wrapped up on October 6, 2019.

Ratings

Notes

References

External links
  
 
 

Seoul Broadcasting System television dramas
Korean-language television shows
2019 South Korean television series debuts
2019 South Korean television series endings
South Korean thriller television series
Television series about revenge
Television series by Studio S